Honey Hill is a small mountain chain located in Central New York Region of New York north of South Valley, New York. It consists of two main peaks the highest being 2181 feet.

References

Mountains of Otsego County, New York
Mountains of New York (state)